John Dare may refer to:
 John Dare (cricketer), Guyanese cricketer
 John T. Dare, politician, in Arizona, California and Hawaii

See also
 Johnny Dare, American radio personality